Robert Lenard Bogle (January 16, 1934 – June 14, 2009) was a founding member of the instrumental combo The Ventures. He and Don Wilson founded the group in 1958. Bogle was the lead guitarist and later bassist of the group. In 2008, Bogle and other members of The Ventures were inducted into the Rock and Roll Hall of Fame in the Performer category.

Biography
Born near Wagoner, Oklahoma, Bogle worked as a bricklayer in California from the age of 15. A self-taught guitar player, Bogle met Don Wilson in Seattle in 1958, where they worked together on various construction sites. They went on to form a band, The Versatones, which evolved into The Ventures. Bogle's lead guitar on the Ventures' 1960 cover of "Walk, Don't Run" helped to influence the next generation of guitarists including John Fogerty, Steve Miller, Joe Walsh and Stevie Ray Vaughan. Bogle's use of the vibrato arm was particularly notable, as it was also with their second single, "Perfidia". 

The Ventures' song "Wild Child" was sampled by the Wiseguys on "Start the Commotion", giving Bogle his only hit writing credit on the British charts, reaching number 47 and spending 2 weeks on the chart.

Bogle died at age 75 on June 14, 2009 from non-Hodgkin lymphoma in Vancouver, Washington.

References

1934 births
2009 deaths
People from Wagoner, Oklahoma
Deaths from cancer in Washington (state)
Deaths from non-Hodgkin lymphoma
Guitarists from Oklahoma
20th-century American guitarists
American male guitarists
The Ventures members
20th-century American male musicians